Ab-e Garm Rural District is in the Central District of Sareyn County, Ardabil province, Iran. At the census of 2006, its population was 7,844 in 1,718 households; there were 3,950 inhabitants in 1,173 households at the following census of 2011; and in the most recent census of 2016, the population of the rural district was 3,825 in 1,134 households. The largest of its eight villages was Kordeh Deh, with 1,077 people.

References 

Sareyn County

Rural Districts of Ardabil Province

Populated places in Ardabil Province

Populated places in Sareyn County